The A42 autoroute is a short motorway in France. Being completed in 1987, the road connects the city of Lyon to its junction with the A40 roughly 50 km north-east of Lyon.

Characteristics
 2x2 lanes
 2x3 lanes between Lyon and Pérouges (26 km)
 70 km long
 Service areas

History
 1983: Section between Neyron and Chazey (30 km) opened
 1988: Section between Chazey and Pont-d'Ain (19.5 km) opened

Junctions

External links

A42 autoroute in Saratlas

A42